Margaret "Peg" Hillias (June 24, 1906 – March 18, 1960) was an American actress of stage, film and television. 

Born in Council Bluffs, Iowa, Hillias first acted as a student at Northeast High School. She also acted at the Kansas City Theater and the Resident Theater. 

On radio, Hillias was the lead actress in Manhattan Mother and worked in three other serials. She also participated in USO entertainment overseas during World War II. 

Hillias portrayed Eunice Hubbell, neighbor to Stanley and Stella Kowalski in A Streetcar Named Desire, which she played on Broadway and reprised in the film version, starring Vivien Leigh and Marlon Brando. 

Hillias died on March 18, 1960, in St. Luke's Hospital in Kansas City from complications that followed heart surgery.

Filmography

1951: A Streetcar Named Desire - Eunice Hubbell
1952: CBS Television Workshop (TV Series)
1952: Kraft Theatre (TV Series)
1953: The Doctor (TV Series)
1954: Inner Sanctum (TV Series) - Elizabeth
1954: The Mask (TV Series)
1954: The Telltale Clue (TV Series) - Martha Connor
1953-1954 Philco-Goodyear Television Playhouse (TV Series) - Mrs. Preiss
1955: Star Tonight (TV Series)
1955: Producers' Showcase (TV Series) - Mrs. Webb
1954-1955: The United States Steel Hour (TV Series) - Mrs. Joddy / Miss Clemm
1955: Frontier (TV Series) - Sister Superior
1956: Dr. Christian (TV Series) - Ruth Belford
1954-1956: The Big Story (TV Series) - Anne Foley
1956: Gunsmoke (TV Series) - Jenny
1956: Telephone Time (TV Series) - Dot Peters
1957: State Trooper (TV Series) - Virginia Syckles
1954-1957 Goodyear Playhouse (TV Series) - Narrator
1957: That Night! - Doctor
1957: The Wayward Girl - Hilda Carlson
1950-1957 Studio One in Hollywood (TV Series) - Mrs. Bayley / Widow Baines / Miss Martha / Freda Benson / Meg March / Margaret March
1957: Have Gun - Will Travel (TV Series) - Mrs. Jonas
1957: Peyton Place - Marion Partridge
1955-1958 Matinee Theatre (TV Series) - Mrs. Allen
1958: Tombstone Territory (TV Series) - Mrs. Danbury
1958: The George Burns and Gracie Allen Show (TV Series) - Madame Grishka
1958: Wagon Train (TV Series) - Jenny Barrister
1957-1958 The Californians (TV Series) - Sarah Jameson / Nellie Bender
1958: Playhouse 90 (TV Series) - Mrs. Howell
1959: Special Agent 7 (TV Series) - Mrs. Talbot (final appearance)

References

External links
 
 

1906 births
1960 deaths
American film actresses
American stage actresses
American television actresses
Actresses from Iowa
People from Council Bluffs, Iowa
20th-century American actresses